Taxinine M is a tetracyclic taxane isolate derived from Taxus brevifolia, Taxus chinensis, and Taxus mairei.

References

Taxanes
Tetracyclic compounds
Methoxy compounds
Acetate esters
Vinylidene compounds